Donaueschingen (Duo) 1976 is a live album by American composer and saxophonist Anthony Braxton and trombonist George E. Lewis recorded in Germany in 1976 but not released on the hatART label until 1994.

Reception

The AllMusic review by Scott Yanow states, "A live set featuring duets by trombonist George Lewis and the reeds of Anthony Braxton might seem as if it would be a bit tedious, but the instant communication between the two keep the music continually fascinating. ...Listeners with open ears will enjoy this colorful set".

Track listing
 "Fred's Garden/Composition 6F: 73° Kelvin/Composition 64: PN-445-WNK/Duet 1" (Lewis/Braxton/Braxton/Lewis) - 41:20 
 "Donna Lee" (Charlie Parker) - 3:26

Personnel
Anthony Braxton - alto saxophone, sopranino saxophone, clarinet, contrabass clarinet, soprano clarinet, flutes, contrabass saxophone
George Lewis - trombone

References

Hathut Records live albums
Anthony Braxton live albums
George E. Lewis live albums
1994 live albums